Kakothrips is a genus of thrip.

Species 
The following species are accepted within Kakothrips:

 Kakothrips acanthus 
 Kakothrips borberae 
 Kakothrips dentatus 
 Kakothrips dolosus 
 Kakothrips firmoides 
 Kakothrips pisivorus 
 Kakothrips priesneri 
 Kakothrips priesnerorum 
 Kakothrips robustus

References 

Thripidae
Insects described in 1914
Insects of Europe